Nikolai Novosjolov (born 9 June 1980) is an Estonian right-handed épée fencer, two-time individual world champion, and four-time Olympian.

Novosjolov competed in the 2000 Sydney Olympic Games, the 2008 Beijing Olympic Games, the 2012 London Olympic Games, and the 2016 Rio de Janeiro Olympic Games.

Medal Record

World Championship

European Championship

Grand Prix

World Cup

Orders 
 Order of the White Star, 3rd Class

References

External links

 
 
 
 

1980 births
Living people
Sportspeople from Haapsalu
Estonian male épée fencers
Fencers at the 2000 Summer Olympics
Fencers at the 2008 Summer Olympics
Fencers at the 2012 Summer Olympics
Fencers at the 2016 Summer Olympics
Universiade medalists in fencing
Olympic fencers of Estonia
Estonian people of Russian descent
Universiade bronze medalists for Estonia
Recipients of the Order of the White Star, 3rd Class
European Games competitors for Estonia
Fencers at the 2015 European Games
Medalists at the 2001 Summer Universiade
Estonian sports coaches
Fencing coaches
20th-century Estonian people
21st-century Estonian people